Jim Robson OBC (born January 17, 1935) is a former radio and television broadcaster who was the play-by-play announcer of the Vancouver Canucks' games from 1970 to 1999.

Broadcasting career
Robson started his career at the age of 17 covering senior men's basketball for CJAV radio station in Port Alberni. In 1955, Robson started working for CHUB radio in Nanaimo, where he covered the Mann Cup lacrosse finals.

By 1956, Robson found himself in Vancouver covering the BC Lions football team, the Vancouver Mounties baseball team and the then WHL Vancouver Canucks hockey team on CKWX.

Vancouver Canucks
When the Vancouver Canucks became an NHL expansion team in 1970, Robson moved to CKNW to announce the team's games;  he was popularly known as the "Voice of the Canucks" for nearly three decades.  For the first seven years, he usually worked alone.  For road games, he broadcast the game without a colour commentator and provided the pre-game, intermission, and post-game shows.  In 1977–78, he was joined by former BC Lions player and broadcaster Tom Larscheid.  From 1983–84 to 1987–88, his broadcasting partner was ex-Canuck Garry Monahan.  Larscheid rejoined him in 1988–89.

He also covered the Vancouver Canucks on television broadcasts on BCTV, CHEK-TV and VTV from 1985–86 through 1998–99. From 1987–88 to 1993–94, Robson provided both radio and television play-by-play for the Canucks on simulcasts, alongside colour commentators Monahan and Larscheid.

Robson stepped down as the radio announcer for the Canucks in 1994 and moved to television full-time. His last radio broadcast was game seven of the 1994 Stanley Cup Finals between the Canucks and the New York Rangers. Robson served as the Canucks' TV announcer for five more seasons, working alongside colour commentators Darcy Rota (1994–95 to 1995–96) and Ryan Walter (1996–97 to 1998–99). His replacement on radio was Jim Hughson, who later moved to Rogers Sportsnet, and then to CBC's Hockey Night in Canada. In his final year, Robson split television play-by-play duties with rookie John Shorthouse, who is now the announcer for the Canucks on TV and radio.

National television
Jim Robson also worked for CBC's Hockey Night in Canada, mostly covering games in western Canada. It was for HNIC that he broadcast the Canucks' first NHL game, a 3–1 home loss to the Los Angeles Kings on October 9, 1970.

He also covered the NHL All-Star Games in 1977 (Vancouver), 1981 (Los Angeles), and 1983 (Long Island). He left HNIC after the 1984–85 season, but had a couple of national TV assignments afterward; for CBC in the 1987 playoffs and CanWest Global for the 1988 Smythe Division Final between the Edmonton Oilers and Calgary Flames.

Nationally, Jim Robson is probably best remembered for his call of Bob Nystrom's Cup-winning overtime goal for the Islanders in 1980. Locally, his voice is linked to every significant Canucks moment in the '70s, '80s, and '90s, particularly the 1982 and 1994 Stanley Cup playoffs.

Robson was also well known for taking time to say "a special hello to all the hospital patients and shut-ins, those of you who can't make it out to the game", during each of his broadcasts, both on radio and TV. On Hockey Night in Canada, he also used to make a statement prior to the opening face-off regarding team uniform colors, for example, "tonight it's the Vancouver Canucks at the Calgary Flames, the Flames in home jerseys- trimmed in gold & white; the Canucks in road jerseys- trimmed in black & yellow". The notion of 'trimmed' was Robson's unique quote among HNIC play-by-play announcers.

Achievements
Off-the-air, Jim was involved in the community being in-demand as a guest speaker for numerous fund-raising dinners and banquets throughout the province of British Columbia. He served as a Director of the BC Benevolent Hockey Association and the Canucks Alumni.

Jim was awarded the Foster Hewitt Memorial Award by the Hockey Hall of Fame in 1992, and was inducted into the B.C. Hockey Hall of Fame in 1998 and the B.C. Sports Hall of Fame in 2000.

In 2002, at the Canadian Association of Broadcasters annual meeting in Vancouver, Jim Robson was inducted to the CAB Broadcast Hall of Fame.

The broadcast booth at Rogers Arena is named after him.

Memorable calls

References

1935 births
Canadian sports announcers
Living people
National Hockey League broadcasters
Minor League Baseball broadcasters
Lacrosse announcers
Canadian Football League announcers
People from Prince Albert, Saskatchewan
Foster Hewitt Memorial Award winners
History of Vancouver
People from Vancouver
Vancouver Canucks announcers